Lake Enol is a small highland lake in the Principality of Asturias, Spain. It is located in the Picos de Europa Western Massif, Cantabrian Mountains. It is next to Lake Ercina and together, they form the group known as Lakes of Covadonga, inside the Picos de Europa National Park. Lake Enol is the larger of the two. It is situated approximately 10 km from Covadonga and 25 km from Cangas de Onís. A curving road is available from Arriondas to the lake. Measuring , it is one of the biggest lakes in the area. It was formed by the withdrawal of a front glacier.

Culture 
A submerged image of the Virgin Mary is elevated every year on 8 September and then taken out for a procession. Regional dancing occurs at Lake Enol during the Fiesta del Pastor on 25 July.

References

Bibliography

External links

Picos de Europa
Enol